Bing Health (previously Live Search Health) is a health-related search service as part of Microsoft's Bing search engine. It is a search engine specifically for health-related information through a variety of trusted and credible sources, including Medstory, Mayo Clinic, National Institutes of Health's MedlinePlus, as well as from Wikipedia.

History
Bing Health comes about as a result of the Microsoft's acquisition of Medstory in February 2007, gaining a foothold in the health search and health information market. It was released for beta testing on October 8, 2007 as Live Search Health and served as the front-end to Microsoft HealthVault Search. Search results in Live Search Health were presented in a three-column layout with health-related articles from the trusted sources in the left, web search results in the middle, and sponsored results on the right. The topic dashboard also displays relevant topics, and allow users to add the search results to their scrapbook in Microsoft HealthVault Account. One particular feature for Live Search Health is that all health search queries and responses were encrypted to provide a measure of privacy and security when dealing with health issues.

However, on June 3, 2009, the Live Search Health front-end became fully integrated into Bing search results, accessible only via the "Explorer pane" on the left when the contextual search engine detects a health-related search query entered.

On January 10, 2010, Bing Health search results got an upgrade. Typing in a specific illness will now highlight important information such as related conditions, and common medications to reduce symptoms. In addition reference materials and documentation about the disease and its history can be shown.

Bing Health is only available in the United States

See also
Bing
Microsoft HealthVault
Windows Live

References

External links

Health
Internet properties established in 2010